"Sinking Ships" is a song by the Bee Gees, released as the B-side of "Words" in January 1968. It was written by Barry, Robin & Maurice Gibb and produced by Robert Stigwood and the Bee Gees. The song was unusual for the group in that it featured solo vocal lines from all three Gibb brothers. It was reissued in Germany in 1987. Both tracks were released as a double A in Germany, Netherlands, Japan and France.

The song's structure is a similar to that of "Horizontal", with three verses and a false fade at the end of the verse two.

Track listing
All songs written and composed by Barry, Robin & Maurice Gibb.

Personnel
 Barry Gibb — lead vocals, guitar
 Robin Gibb — lead vocals, organ
 Maurice Gibb — lead vocals, bass, piano, Mellotron
 Colin Petersen — drums
 Vince Melouney — lead guitar
 Bill Shepherd — orchestral arrangement

References

1968 songs
Bee Gees songs
Songs written by Barry Gibb
Songs written by Robin Gibb
Songs written by Maurice Gibb
Song recordings produced by Robert Stigwood
Song recordings produced by Barry Gibb
Song recordings produced by Robin Gibb
Song recordings produced by Maurice Gibb